Havanduk (also Romanized as Havandūk; also known as Havandak) is a village in Baranduz Rural District, in the Central District of Urmia County, West Azerbaijan Province, Iran. At the 2006 census, its population was 59, in 15 families.

References 

Populated places in Urmia County